Wild!! is a jazz album by Terry Silverlight.

Track listing
All songs are written by Terry Silverlight.

Personnel
Terry Silverlight: composer, drums, percussion, keyboards
Will Lee: bass
Edgar Winter: vocals, alto sax
Paul Shaffer: organ
Hiram Bullock, Chuck Loeb: guitar
Lew Soloff: trumpet
David Mann: tenor and soprano sax
Charles Blenzig, Mike Ricchiuti: keyboards
John Clark: French horn

References

External links

Jazz albums by American artists
2004 albums